William Aiken Jr. (January 28, 1806September 6, 1887) was the 61st governor of South Carolina, serving from 1844 to 1846.  He also served in the state legislature and the United States House of Representatives, running unsuccessfully for speaker of the House in 1856 in "the longest and most contentious Speaker election in House history."

Aiken was one of the state's wealthiest citizens and a slave owner.  He owned one of the largest rice plantation in the state—Jehossee Island—with over 700 enslaved black people on 1,500 acres under cultivation, almost twice the acreage of the next largest plantation. By 1860, Aiken owned the entire Jehossee Island, and the plantation produced 1.5 million pounds of rice in addition to sweet potatoes and corn. After the Civil War, the plantation regained its preeminence, producing 1.2 million pounds of rice. Today, descendants of the Aiken family, the Maybanks, still own part of the island, having sold the remainder in 1992 to the U.S. as part of the ACE Basin National Wildlife Refuge.

Early life

Aiken was the child of William Aiken, the first president of the pioneering South Carolina Canal and Rail Road Company, and Henrietta Wyatt. Unfortunately, William Sr. was killed in a Charleston carriage accident and never saw his namesake town of Aiken, South Carolina. Aiken graduated from the College of South Carolina (now the University of South Carolina) at Columbia in 1825 and engaged in agriculture as a planter, entering politics in 1837. He was a member of the State House of Representatives 1838–1842, and served in the State Senate 1842–1844. His term as governor ran from 1844 to 1846.

Congressional service
Subsequent to his service as governor, Aiken served in the U. S. House of Representatives for the Thirty-second Congress, and he was returned to the Thirty-third and Thirty-fourth Congresses, from March 4, 1851, to March 3, 1857. In December 1855, Aiken was a leading candidate for Speaker of the House of Representatives. After two months and 133 ballots, Aiken lost the race to Nathaniel P. Banks by a vote of 103 to 100, in what has been termed "the longest and most contentious Speaker election in House history". In 1866 he was elected to represent his district in the Fortieth Congress, while the state was under a provisional governor, and he was not seated.

Personal life

In 1831 Aiken was married to Harriet Lowndes Aiken (1812–1892) and had a daughter with her named Henrietta Aiken Rhett (1836–1918).

Following the Dred Scott decision, Aiken began traveling to more temperate Northern locations in the summer with some of his slaves, and became an early patron of the University of Minnesota, loaning it some $28,000 (approximately $750,000 in 2016 terms).

Throughout the American civil war he was a loyal Unionist, though his friends were nearly all Secessionists.

He was a successful businessman and planter and lived in Charleston, South Carolina. Aiken's first cousin, D. Wyatt Aiken served as a Confederate States Army officer and five-term U.S. Congressman. Aiken died at Flat Rock, NC, September 6, 1887, and was interred in Magnolia Cemetery at Charleston, South Carolina. His house, the Aiken-Rhett House, is part of the Historic Charleston foundation.

References

Attribution

External links 

SCIway Biography of William Aiken Jr.
NGA Biography of William Aiken Jr.

1806 births
1887 deaths
19th-century American politicians
American planters
American slave owners
Burials at Magnolia Cemetery (Charleston, South Carolina)
Democratic Party members of the United States House of Representatives from South Carolina
Democratic Party governors of South Carolina
Democratic Party members of the South Carolina House of Representatives
Politicians from Charleston, South Carolina
Democratic Party South Carolina state senators
University of South Carolina alumni
University of South Carolina trustees